Sutton St Edmunds is a village and civil parish in the South Holland district of Lincolnshire, England, about  south-east from the town of Spalding.

Sutton St Edmunds was a chapelry to the parish of Long Sutton until 1866. The parish includes the hamlet of Throckenholt.

The parish church is a red-brick Grade II listed building dedicated to Saint Edmund. It was completely rebuilt in 1795, and has 19th-century alterations and extensions. It was extended again in 1987.

The village has a village hall.

Guarnock House is a red-brick Grade II listed building. It was built in 1699 and has a 20th-century roof.

Sutton St Edmunds school was built in 1896 by Sutton St Edmunds School Board. It became a council school in 1903. It was known as Sutton St Edmund Chapel End School in the 20th century. It closed in 1969–70.

Throckenholt Priory was sited here. It was a hermitage and chapel in existence from at least  1107–1540. It was granted to Thorney Abbey by Nigel, Bishop of Ely.

References

External links

Sutton St Edmund Parish Council
Sutton St Edmund Roll of Honour

Villages in Lincolnshire
Civil parishes in Lincolnshire
South Holland, Lincolnshire